Suckers: How Alternative Medicine Makes Fools of Us All is a book about alternative medicine written by author and health journalist Rose Shapiro. It was published by Harvill Secker in 2008. It covers very similar ground to Simon Singh and Edzard Ernst's book Trick or Treatment?, but is written in a more journalistic and polemical style. It provides substantial detail regarding alternative treatments offered to cancer patients.

After reviewing the research into a variety of alternative treatments, Shapiro concludes that:

Reception
The Guardian called it a "vigorous polemic" and said Shapiro's writing was "adept" and The Daily Telegraph said that "Shapiro expertly describes the pathology of medical counter knowledge". Writer Natalie Haynes, writing in New Humanist, called it an "excellent book."

References

2008 non-fiction books
Alternative medicine
Scientific skepticism mass media
Harvill Secker books